The AIC Serie A Team of the Year (in Italian: Squadra dell’anno AIC) is an annual award given to a set of eleven footballers in the top tier of Italian football, the Serie A, who are considered to have performed the best during the previous calendar season. It is awarded within the Gran Galà del Calcio event.

The award has been presented since the 2010–11 season. The shortlist is compiled by the members of the players' trade union, the Italian Footballers' Association (AIC).

Winners
Players in bold also won the Serie A Footballer of the Year award.

2010–11
Source:

2011–12
Source:

2012–13

Source:

2013–14

Source:

2014–15

Source:

2015–16

Source:

2016–17

Source:

2017–18

Source:

2018–19

Source:

2019–20

Source:

2020–21

Source:

2021–22

Source:

Appearances by player
5 times: Gianluigi Buffon, Giorgio Chiellini

4 times: Nicolò Barella, Andrea Barzagli, Leonardo Bonucci, Paulo Dybala, Kalidou Koulibaly, Ciro Immobile, Andrea Pirlo, Miralem Pjanić, Radja Nainggolan

3 times: Edinson Cavani, Antonio Di Natale, Marek Hamšík, Samir Handanović, Theo Hernandez, Gonzalo Higuaín, Christian Maggio, Paul Pogba, Cristiano Ronaldo

2 times: João Cancelo, Matteo Darmian, Stefan de Vrij, Gianluigi Donnarumma, Zlatan Ibrahimović, Mauro Icardi, Claudio Marchisio, Sergej Milinković-Savić, Alex Sandro, Thiago Silva, Carlos Tevez, Arturo Vidal

1 time: Luis Alberto, Dani Alves, Pablo Armero, Kwadwo Asamoah, Mario Balotelli, Alessandro Bastoni, Federico Balzaretti, Alisson Becker, Medhi Benatia, Kevin-Prince Boateng, Gleison Bremer, Marcelo Brozović, Federico Chiesa, Mattia De Sciglio, Giovanni Di Lorenzo, Papu Gómez, Robin Gosens, Achraf Hakimi, Josip Iličić, Franck Kessié, Aleksandar Kolarov, Rafael Leão, Romelu Lukaku, Mike Maignan, Dries Mertens, Thiago Motta, Luis Muriel, Alessandro Nesta, Antonio Nocerino, Fabio Quagliarella, Andrea Ranocchia, Daniele Rugani, Fikayo Tomori, Luca Toni, Borja Valero, Dušan Vlahović, Duván Zapata

Appearances by club

Footnotes

References

External links
 List of Gran Galà del Calcio winners on the AIC official website

team
Oscar del Calcio
Awards established in 2011